Justin Addo Johnson (born 27 August 1996) is a Dutch professional footballer who plays as a winger for Chorley. His previous clubs are Dundee United and Hamilton Academical in Scotland, York City in England and Othellos Athienou and Akritas Chlorakas in Cyprus.

Early life
Johnson was born in The Hague, South Holland, and started his career as a youth player with Sparta Rotterdam. After moving to England, he joined the Manchester United Academy, but was released and joined the football academy at the Manchester College. From there, he joined the youth squad of non-League club F.C. United of Manchester.

Career
After leaving F.C. United, Johnson joined Dundee United's development squad as an amateur player in March 2015. He signed a three-year professional contract in May 2015 and made his first-team debut as a substitute two days later, in a Scottish Premiership match against Inverness Caledonian Thistle. Dundee United manager Jackie McNamara described Johnson as a "crowd pleaser" with "great potential".

On 1 September 2016, Johnson was loaned to National League club York City, managed by McNamara, for the rest of the 2016–17 season. On 31 January 2017, his loan to York and his Dundee United contract were both cancelled by mutual consent.

Johnson was without a club in the 2017-18 season before joining Othellos Athienou in the Cypriot Second Division for 2018-19. The following season he joined Akritas Chlorakas on a season long loan.

On 4 August 2020, Johnson made a return to Scottish football, signing for Premiership club Hamilton Academical. Along with teammate Tunde Owolabi, he was released by mutual consent in February 2021.

Later that month, Johnson signed a contract with Greenock Morton of the Scottish Championship until the end of the 2020–21 season. He made his debut for Morton from the bench in a defeat against Ayr United. He left Morton in June 2021 when his contract expired.

In September 2021, Johnson joined Stalybridge Celtic. He made his debut in a league match against Gainsborough Trinity on 18 September.

Johnson signed for National League North side Chorley in July 2022 after impressing in pre-season matches.

Career statistics

References

External links

1996 births
Living people
Footballers from The Hague
Dutch footballers
Dutch expatriate footballers
Association football wingers
Sparta Rotterdam players
Manchester United F.C. players
F.C. United of Manchester players
Dundee United F.C. players
York City F.C. players
Othellos Athienou F.C. players
Akritas Chlorakas players
Scottish Professional Football League players
National League (English football) players
Cypriot Second Division players
Expatriate footballers in England
Expatriate footballers in Scotland
Expatriate footballers in Cyprus
Dutch expatriate sportspeople in England
Dutch expatriate sportspeople in Scotland
Dutch expatriate sportspeople in Cyprus
Hamilton Academical F.C. players
Greenock Morton F.C. players
Stalybridge Celtic F.C. players
Northern Premier League players